Mario Raimondi (born 10 July 1980) is a former Swiss football player. His last club was BSC Young Boys.

He joined Young Boys on 5 July 2005.

References

External links
 BSC Young Boys profile 

1980 births
Living people
Swiss men's footballers
Switzerland under-21 international footballers
Swiss Super League players
FC Zürich players
BSC Young Boys players
FC Thun players
Place of birth missing (living people)
Association football defenders